Charm City is a 2018 crime documentary film directed by Marilyn Ness. The film follows a community in Baltimore, Maryland, over the span of three years of high violence. The film primarily focuses on two threads: the governmental response to the violence—both by the police and the city council—and the citizens' response and the community groups they form.

The film debuted at the 2018 Tribeca Film Festival and Maryland Film Festival before a wider release.

Synopsis

Cast 

 Clayton “Mr. C” Guyton
 Alex Long
 Major Monique Brown
 Officer Eric Winston
 Officer John Gregorio
 Councilman Brandon Scott

Release

Critical response 
On the review aggregator Rotten Tomatoes, the film holds an approval rating of 100% based on 16 reviews, with an average rating of 8.06/10. Metacritic, which uses a weighted average, assigned the film a score of 85 out of 100, based on five critics, indicating "universal acclaim." The film was on the short list for the Academy Award for Best Documentary Feature.

Ben Kenigsberg writing for the New York Times wrote, "The film captures up close the way violence transforms neighborhoods and families with an immediacy that transcends headlines or sensationalism."

References

External links 

 

2018 documentary films
Documentary films about crime in the United States